Shawnee Mission Northwest High School is a fully accredited public high school located in Shawnee, Kansas, United States, serving students in grades 9-12.  It is one of five high schools operated by Shawnee Mission USD 512 school district.  The school colors are orange, black, and white. The school population is approximately 1,850 students.  The current principal is Lisa Gruman. 

Shawnee Mission Northwest was founded in 1969 in order to help educate the increasing number of students due to the emerging population of Shawnee Mission. The school launched the International Baccalaureate program at the start of the 2008–2009 school year. Shawnee Mission Northwest is a member of the Kansas State High School Activities Association and offers a variety of sports programs. Athletic teams compete in the 6A division and are known as the "Cougars".

History
Shawnee Mission Northwest High School was established in 1969 to help educate the increasing populations of Shawnee and Overland Park, Kansas. In 1998, a mural of evolution was painted near the science rooms in the school which created controversy throughout the school and the city. The mural depicted many things including DNA, cells, photosynthesis, and a four chambered heart. In addition to this, the mural also depicted in a series of walking figures, the evolution of man, from a hunched-over, hairy, apelike creature to the modern man. The mural offended many students and their parents and a large debate was held concerning whether to paint over the mural. In the end, the mural was left alone and remains today.

Academics

In 2001, Shawnee Mission Northwest High School was selected as a Blue Ribbon School. The Blue Ribbon Award recognizes public and private schools which perform at high levels or have made significant academic improvements. In 2008, Shawnee Mission Northwest launched the International Baccalaureate program for the 2008–2009 school year.

Faculty
In 2004, history teacher Dan Fullerton was named the 2004 Kansas Outstanding Teacher of American History by the Kansas Society Daughters of the American Revolution.

In 2005, social studies teacher Ron Poplau was named a Disney Teacher Award Honoree.

Extracurricular activities

Athletics
The Cougars compete in the Sunflower League and are classified as a 6A school, the largest classification in Kansas according to the KSHSAA. Throughout its history, Shawnee Mission Northwest has won many state championships in various sports. Many graduates have gone on to participate in Division I, Division II, and Division III athletics. Spanning from 1994 to 2007, the Northwest boys varsity cross-country team won the state title for fourteen consecutive years and nineteen years overall.

State Championships

School newspaper and yearbook
The school newspaper is The Northwest Passage and the yearbook is The Lair. The Passage, Lair, and the journalism website have received national recognition at journalism conventions across the country, including awards like the Crown Award from the Columbia Scholastic Press Association  and Pacemaker awards from the National Scholastic Press Association.

Notable alumni
 1976 graduate Craig Bolerjack, sport commentator
 1978 graduate Willie Fritz, Head Football Coach Tulane University
 1988 graduate Sean Wheelock, sports commentator
 1997 graduate Holly Lou Teeter, United States District Judge
 2000 graduate Ryan Lilja, former American football guard for the Kansas State Wildcats in college then professionally for Kansas City Chiefs and Indianapolis Colts
 2004 graduate Kyle Vogt, founder of Justin.tv and founder and current CEO of Cruise Automation
 2004 graduate Mike Rivera, former linebacker for the Kansas Jayhawks, played professionally for five National Football League teams
 2004 graduate Ryan Torain, former running back for the Arizona State Sun Devils, played professionally for three National Football League teams
 2008 graduate Alex Carder, former quarterback for the Western Michigan Broncos, plays professionally for the Portland Thunder in the Arena Football League

See also

 List of high schools in Kansas
 List of unified school districts in Kansas
Other high schools in Shawnee Mission USD 512 school district
 Shawnee Mission East High School in Prairie Village
 Shawnee Mission North High School in Overland Park
 Shawnee Mission South High School in Overland Park
 Shawnee Mission West High School in Overland Park

References

External links
 
 USD 512 School District Boundary Map, KDOT

Education in Overland Park, Kansas
Schools in Johnson County, Kansas
Public high schools in Kansas
Educational institutions established in 1969
1969 establishments in Kansas